Jhoothi is a 1985 Indian Hindi-language comedy film directed by Hrishikesh Mukherjee. The film stars Rekha, Raj Babbar, Amol Palekar, Supriya Pathak and Deven Verma.

Plot
Kalpana, a tomboyish character, lives with her mother, sister Alpana and brother Kamal, a police inspector. Kalpana is a compulsive liar but always for a good cause, landing herself and others often, in peculiar situations and misunderstandings too. While she sets up her brother with Seema and helps her sister Alpana come closer to Rasik, she herself falls for Dr Anil.

Songs
Maya Govind wrote all the songs.

Cast
Rekha as Kalpana  
Raj Babbar as Dr. Anil
Amol Palekar as Kamal  
Supriya Pathak as Seema 
Deven Verma as Rasik Lal Sharma 
Prema Narayan as Alpana 
Madan Puri as Professor Puri 
Goga Kapoor as Babulal 
Shammi as Shanti  
Dina Pathak as Seema's mother 
Suresh Chatwal as Pancha

References

External links
 

1980s Hindi-language films
1985 films
Films directed by Hrishikesh Mukherjee
Films scored by Bappi Lahiri
Indian comedy-drama films